Cyclosemia is a genus of skippers in the family Hesperiidae.

Species
Recognised species in the genus Cyclosemia include:
 Cyclosemia herennius (Stoll, 1782)

References

Natural History Museum Lepidoptera genus database

Carcharodini
Hesperiidae genera
Taxa named by Paul Mabille